Messier 106 (also known as NGC 4258) is an intermediate spiral galaxy in the constellation Canes Venatici. It was discovered by Pierre Méchain in 1781. M106 is at a distance of about 22 to 25 million light-years away from Earth. M106 contains an active nucleus classified as a Type 2 Seyfert, and the presence of a central supermassive black hole has been demonstrated from radio-wavelength observations of the rotation of a disk of molecular gas orbiting within the inner light-year around the black hole.  NGC 4217 is a possible companion galaxy of Messier 106. A Type II supernova was observed in M106 in May 2014.

Characteristics
M106 has a water vapor megamaser (the equivalent of a laser operating in microwave instead of visible light and on a galactic scale) that is seen by the 22-GHz line of ortho-H2O that evidences dense and warm molecular gas. Water masers are useful for observing nuclear accretion disks in active galaxies. The water masers in M106 enabled the first case of a direct measurement of the distance to a galaxy, thereby providing an independent anchor for the cosmic distance ladder. M106 has a slightly warped, thin, almost edge-on Keplerian disc which is on a subparsec scale. It surrounds a central area with mass .

It is one of the largest and brightest nearby galaxies, similar in size and luminosity to the Andromeda Galaxy.

M106 has also played an important role in calibrating the cosmic distance ladder. Before, Cepheid variables from other galaxies could not be used to measure distances since they cover ranges of metallicities different from the Milky Way's. M106 contains Cepheid variables similar to both the metallicities of the Milky Way and other galaxies' Cepheids. By measuring the distance of the Cepheids with metallicities similar to our galaxy, astronomers are able to recalibrate the other Cepheids with different metallicities, a key fundamental step in improving quantification of distances to other galaxies in the universe.

See also
 List of Messier objects
Canes II Group

References

External links

 StarDate: M106 Fact Sheet
 Spiral Galaxy M106 at SEDS Messier pages
 
 NGC 4258: Mysterious Arms Revealed 
 Spiral Galaxy Messier 106 (NGC 4258) at the astro-photography site of Takayuki Yoshida
 
 
 Messier 106 at Constellation Guide

Intermediate spiral galaxies
Seyfert galaxies
Canes II Group
Canes Venatici
106
NGC objects
07353
39600
Astronomical objects discovered in 1781
Discoveries by Pierre Méchain